Palana is a village in Vaso taluka, Kheda District, Gujarat, India.  It has panchayat raj system. There are two lakes within the village boundaries, and a canal runs nearby. Communities in the village include Hindu, Rjput, Prajapati, Patel, Bhraman, Harijan, Vaishnav, and Muslim. Palana was named after Pala Patel (1222 AD).

References

Villages in Kheda district